Matías Nicolás Draghi (born 22 March 1993) is an Argentine footballer who plays as a goalkeeper for Estudiantes de Mérida .

Career
In the beginning of January 2019, Draghi joined Sport Club Pacífico in Argentina. On 10 October 2019, Draghi was announced as a new player of Deportivo Mixco in Guatemala. However, at the end of the same month, it was reported that the official transfer could not be completed since the club never received the transfer formula.

References

External links
Matías Draghi at Ascenso MX 

Matías Draghi at BDFA 

1993 births
Living people
Sportspeople from Mendoza Province
Argentine footballers
Association football goalkeepers
Independiente Rivadavia footballers
CF Reus Deportiu players
CF Gavà players
Venados F.C. players
Estudiantes de Mérida players
Ascenso MX players
Venezuelan Primera División players
Argentine expatriate footballers
Argentine expatriate sportspeople in Spain
Argentine expatriate sportspeople in Mexico
Argentine expatriate sportspeople in Venezuela
Expatriate footballers in Spain
Expatriate footballers in Mexico
Expatriate footballers in Venezuela